"Honky-Tonk Man" is a song co-written and recorded by American singer Johnny Horton. It was released in March 1956 as his debut single on Columbia Records, and the album of the same name reaching number 9 on the U.S. country singles charts. Horton re-released the song six years later, taking it to number 11 on the same chart.

Background
Song-writing credits for "Honky-Tonk Man" have been attributed to Johnny Horton, Howard Hausey and Tillman Franks.  In late-1955 Hausey, an aspiring songwriter, went to Shreveport, Louisiana (from where the Louisiana Hayride was broadcast) to pitch three of his songs to Johnny Horton.  Horton and his manager, Tillman Franks, liked the up-tempo "Honky-Tonk Man", but before it was recorded a deal was negotiated to include Horton and Franks in the publishing royalties (both of whom may have assisted in re-fashioning the melody).

"Honky-Tonk Man" was recorded on 11 January 1956 at the Bradley Barn Studio in Nashville.  Session musicians on the recording were Grady Martin and Harold Bradley, as well as Bill Black (at the time Elvis Presley’s bassist).  Soon afterwards "Honky-Tonk Man" was released as a single (Columbia label: 4-21504) paired with another song from the same session, "I'm Ready if You're Willing". Live shows were subsequently arranged to advertise the single, with the band featuring Tillman Franks on bass and Tommy Tomlinson on guitar.

Critical reception
The single was reviewed in Billboard (10 March 1956).  The review commented on "Honky-Tonk Man" in the following terms:

Content
The lyrics of the song are narrated in the first-person ("I'm a honky-tonk man"), describing a life of drinking and dancing with young women in honky-tonk bars; the account suggests a compulsive or addictive quality to the protagonist's lifestyle ("I can’t seem to stop").  The chorus of the song juxtaposes the narrator’s obsessive and exuberant behaviour with what happens when his "money’s all gone" ("I’m on the telephone callin’: ‘hey hey mama, can your daddy come home?’").

Chart performance

Bob Luman version
In 1970, Bob Luman took a cover version to number 22 on the country charts. It was included on his album Is It Any Wonder That I Love You, from which it was released as the first single. The song was Luman's sixteenth country chart single, spending 14 weeks on the charts.

Dwight Yoakam version

Country music singer Dwight Yoakam released his version of the song as his debut single in 1986. Yoakam's version peaked at number 3 on the Hot Country Singles & Tracks chart; it appears on his debut album, Guitars, Cadillacs, Etc., Etc..

Chart performance
The song debuted at number 74 on the country chart dated March 1, 1986. It charted for 24 weeks on that chart, and peaked at number 3 on the chart dated June 14, 1986.

Music video
This was Yoakam's first music video, and it was directed and produced by Sherman Halsey.

References

1956 songs
1956 debut singles
1962 singles
1970 singles
1986 debut singles
Johnny Horton songs
Bob Luman songs
Dwight Yoakam songs
Columbia Records singles
Epic Records singles
Reprise Records singles
Music videos directed by Sherman Halsey
Songs written by Tillman Franks
Songs written by Johnny Horton
Song recordings produced by Pete Anderson
Song recordings produced by Don Law